Spences Bridge is a community in the Canadian province of British Columbia, situated  north east of Lytton and  south of Ashcroft. At Spences Bridge the Trans-Canada Highway crosses the Thompson River. In 1892, Spences Bridge's population included 32 people of European ancestry and 130 First Nations people. There were five general stores, three hotels, one Church of England and one school. The principal industries are fruit growing and farming. The population as of the 2021 Canadian census was 76, a decrease of 23.2 per cent from the 2016 count of 99.

History

The Kettle Valley Railway included a spur line stretching from Merritt to Spences Bridge. The rail bed is still intact, along with the original bridges.

This settlement was originally known as Cook's Ferry because from 1862 to 1866 Mortimer Cook operated a ferry for crossing the river. The ferry was replaced by a toll bridge built by Thomas Spence under government contract.

In 1905, one of the worst landslides in BC history hit a First Nations village near Spences Bridge. The village was destroyed and 18 people were killed.

On 1 January 2014, the old Spences Bridge, a one-lane steel truss bridge, was decommissioned and permanently closed to all pedestrian and vehicle traffic after 82 years of service. This was deemed necessary by British Columbia Ministry of Transportation and Infrastructure engineers due to the poor condition of the bridge.

Location
North of Spences Bridge is Ashcroft and Cache Creek. Also north is 100 Mile House, Williams Lake, Quesnel, and Prince George. South of Spences Bridge is Lytton, Hope, and Vancouver. East of the town is Merritt and Kelowna.

Spences Bridge's location is mountainous, with higher elevations part of the Interior Plateau. The east side of the Fraser here is part of the Clear Range, a mountainous southwards extension of the Fraser Plateau located in the angle of the Thompson and Fraser Rivers. Arthur Seat lies in that range on the west side of Spences Bridge, and was named by pioneer John Murray for Arthur's Seat in Edinburgh, Scotland.

Climate
Spences Bridge has a semi-arid climate (Köppen climate classification BSk). The climate is very dry and mild by Canadian standards, with an average annual precipitation of just . Winters are short and moderately cold for usually brief periods and sunshine hours are very low for a couple of months, while summers are quite long, hot, sunny and dry – compared to the rest of Canada, albeit with comfortable nights. Like much of the lower-altitude valleys in the Thompson Nicola region, there are more days (on average approx. 40 days per year) when temperature exceeds  than remain below freezing.

Pioneers of Spences Bridge
John Murray
James Teit (ethnographer)
Archibald Clemes
Pierre Morens
Francoise Rey

See also
Fraser Canyon Gold Rush
Cook's Ferry Indian Band
Cariboo Road
Cariboo Gold Rush

References

Designated places in British Columbia
Unincorporated settlements in British Columbia
British Columbia gold rushes
Ghost towns in British Columbia
Thompson Country
Populated places in the Thompson-Nicola Regional District
Natural disasters in British Columbia